Salaga Slave Market is an 18th-century slave market located in the East Gonja District of northern Ghana. During the Trans-Atlantic slave trade, Salaga served as an important market where slaves were transported to the coast for export. The market also served as outposts for the movement of slaves along the trans-Saharan routes.

History 
From the 16th century, Salaga was one of leading market centers in West Africa. Kola, beads, ostrich feathers, animal hides, textiles and gold were among the goods traded in the market. However, in the 18th century, the market became a key center in the trading of humans. People from the Upper west, Upper East and Northern Regions served as sources for slaves. Slaves from the market were mostly exchanged for Kola nuts, cowries and gold.

See also 
 Salaga

References 

African slave trade